Frank Chongwoo Park from Seoul National University, Seoul, South Korea was named Fellow of the Institute of Electrical and Electronics Engineers (IEEE) in 2013 for contributions to geometric methods in robot mechanics.

References

Fellow Members of the IEEE
Living people
Year of birth missing (living people)
Place of birth missing (living people)
Academic staff of Seoul National University